Events from the year 1620 in Sweden

Incumbents
 Monarch – Gustaf II Adolf

Events

 25 November - Wedding of Gustav II Adolf and Maria Eleonora

Births

 4 February - Gustaf Bonde (1620–1667), statesman  (died 1667) 
 date unknown - Agneta Rosenbröijer, noblewoman and businessperson  (died 1697)

Deaths

 Axel Ryning

References

External links

 
Years of the 17th century in Sweden
Sweden